Cerball mac Dúnlainge (patronymic sometimes spelled Dúngaile) (died 888) was king of Ossory in south-east Ireland. The kingdom of Ossory (Osraige) occupied roughly the area of modern County Kilkenny and western County Laois and lay between the larger provincial kingdoms of Munster and Leinster.

Cerball came to prominence after the death of Fedelmid mac Crimthainn, King of Munster, in 847. Ossory had been subject for a period to the Eóganachta kings of Munster, but Feidlimid was succeeded by a series of weak kings who had to contend with Viking incursions on the coasts of Munster. As a result, Cerball was in a strong position and is said to have been the second most powerful king in Ireland in his later years.  Upon his death, he was succeeded by his brother Riagan mac Dúnlainge.

Kjarvalr Írakonungr, a figure in the Norse sagas who appears as an ancestor of many prominent Icelandic families, is identified with Cerball.

Nature of the sources
A large body of contemporary and near-contemporary material on early medieval Ireland has survived. From the titles of works mentioned in these sources, it is clear that a great deal of additional material has now been lost. The surviving materials usually exist in the form of much later copies, and it is only from comparison of the various texts that the original documents can be reconstructed.

The Irish annals which document the ninth century are ultimately derived from the now-lost Chronicle of Ireland which was then being compiled in the midlands of Ireland. All annals include material derived from other sources, or added at a later date. None are complete, although the Annals of Ulster and the Annals of Inisfallen cover Cerball's lifetime. The Annals of Clonmacnoise survive only in an eccentric 17th-century English translation, and the Annals of Tigernach for this period are lost, although Dubhaltach Mac Fhirbhisigh's abbreviated copy known as the Chronicon Scotorum supplies much of the missing material. The Annals of the Four Masters are late, and include some material of doubtful origin. While the annals provide a considerable amount of information, they are generally terse, and most focus their attention on the doings of the Uí Néill, sometimes to the extent of omitting inconvenient events.

A source which concentrates on Cerball's career is the Fragmentary Annals of Ireland, so called because only fragments remain of a seemingly longer work, these again copied by Mac Fhirbhisigh in the 17th century from a 15th-century manuscript. The fragment which deals with Cerball's lifetime ends in the early 870s, so that the last fifteen years of his life are missing. Joan Radner, editor and translator of the modern edition of the Fragmentary Annals, argues that these were compiled at the court of Cerball's great-great-grandson Donnchad mac Gilla Pátraic. Although called annals, these are closer to narrative history and are derived from a number of sources. The basic framework is from the Chronicle of Ireland, but to this has been added a variety of material whose source is unknown, perhaps including early sagas, which concerns Cerball. The Fragmentary Annals were intended to magnify Cerball's achievements, and to present his dealings with Vikings and Norse–Gaels in a favourable light.

If the various annals are partisan, the remaining sources which concern Cerball are notably unreliable. Perhaps inspired by the Fragmentary Annals, which offer some positive views of Vikings and may have been popular in the Norse-Gael Dublin of the 11th century, many Icelandic genealogies include Cerball—Kjarvalr Írakonungr—as an ancestor. Lastly, The Prophecy of Berchán, an 11th-century verse history of kings in Ireland and Scotland presented as a prophecy, may include Cerball.

A very large number of genealogies exist, along with geographical and legal texts. Of these last, the Frithfolad Muman, a document purporting to set out the obligations of the Kings of Munster to their allies, clients, and subjects is of interest as it sheds light on the position of Osraige within the provincial kingship of Munster.

Cerball's Ireland

A memory of the kingdom of Osraige survives today in the name and boundaries of the Roman Catholic Diocese of Ossory. The earliest recorded seat of the bishops was at Saighir, later moved to Aghaboe, and this appears to have been the principal church of the kingdom by the eighth century when the life of Saint Cainnech of Aghaboe was composed. The name Osraige—the Deer people—is among the oldest group of Irish tribal names. Although genealogists in the Early Christian period explained such names by recourse to eponymous ancestors, the names are likely those of totemic animals or tribal deities.

Osraige was only one túath among 150 in Ireland. The average túath was small, perhaps 500 square kilometres in area with a population of some three to four thousand. Osraige was atypical, much larger than this, covering perhaps 2000 square kilometres astride the River Barrow in the modern counties of Kilkenny, Laois, and Offaly. In principle, each tuath had its own king and court and bishop, but political power generally rested with the provincial over-kings.

At the time of Cerball's birth Osraige lay within the province and kingdom of Munster, ruled by the Eóganachta from the royal centre of Cashel. Osraige lay at the extreme eastern edge of Munster bordering the neighbouring province of Leinster. For a period in the seventh century, most of southern Osraige was ruled by the Corcu Loígde, rulers of Munster before the coming of the Eóganachta. The Frithfolad Muman text states that the Osraige had once been kings of Munster and makes it clear that they were a privileged and powerful group, but no longer a major force, "the respectable has-beens of Munster politics".

The period of Cerball's life covered much of the first Viking Age, and he is notably mentioned in later Nordic sources. The Icelandic Landnámabók describes Cearbhall (Kjarvalur) as ruler of Dublin and Earl of Orkney and opens with a list of the most prominent rulers in Viking-age Europe, listing this Ossorian king alongside other well-known rulers of that era, specifically Popes Adrian II and John VIII; Byzantine Emperors Leo VI the Wise and his brother Alexander; Harald Fairhair, king of Norway; Eric Anundsson and his son Björn Eriksson rulers of Sweden; Gorm the Old, king of Denmark; and Alfred the Great, king of England. While several kingdoms in Britain — East Anglia, Fortriu, Mercia, and Northumbria — would collapse under the shock of Viking attacks, their impact in Ireland was very much less immediate. In the first half of the ninth century, raiders appear to have come in small groups, increasing in size until larger forces appear, such as that led by the shadowy Turgéis (Turgesius) in the 840s, and those led by Amlaíb and Ímar from the 850s onwards. Vikings would be both enemies and allies for Cerball and other Irish kings. In the long run, the creation of Norse–Gaelic towns by Vikings operating as traders rather than raiders would change the Irish political landscape, but the results of this were seen in the tenth and eleventh centuries rather than the ninth.

Máel Sechnaill and the Danes
Cerball succeeded his father Dúnlang (or Dúngal) mac Fergaile as king of Osraige in 842. At this time the High King of Ireland was Máel Sechnaill mac Máele Ruanaid who was married to Cerball's sister Land. Cerball in turn was married to a daughter of Máel Sechnaill.

The first report of Cerball is in 846, when Vikings attacked into northern Osraige, destroying a church at Coolcashin (near Galmoy), and plundering an unidentified settlement at Cúl Maine. Here the raiders were besieged for a fortnight by Cerball's army and lost heavily. The following year Cerball defeated an attack by Vikings from the Irish midlands, perhaps from Dublin, led by one Hákon. This battle is said by some sources to have taken place at Carn Brammit, a site which can no longer be identified.<ref>Downham, "Cearbhall", p. 10; Downham, Viking Kings, p. 237; Annals of Ulster, s.a. 848; Annals of the Four Masters, s.a. 846; Chronicon Scotorum, s.a. 847.</ref>

The late Annals of the Four Masters record an invasion of Osraige in 848 by the Uí Ceinnselaig of southern Leinster, led by their king Echtigern mac Guaire. Cerball played a part in Echtgern's removal in 853. The Annals of Ulster report that Echtigern was killed "deceitfully" by Cerball and one Bruatur of Áed, and that Bruatur was killed by his own household a week later.

In 854, the Fragmentary Annals say that Cerball was sent into Munster by his brother-in-law to collect tribute and hostages.

In 855, he is said to have slaughtered a Viking force under a certain Rodolb. In the aftermath of the battle Cerball was captured by other Vikings, but succeeded in escaping. Shortly afterwards Cerball aided a force of Danes led by a chief named Horm in their war with the Norwegians. The Danes may well have settled at what is now Waterford. The Munstermen asked Cerball's help against the Norse, and Cerball with the men of Osraige, Horm's Danes and some of the men of Munster inflicted a heavy defeat on the Norse. His ally Horm was killed raiding in Wales by Rhodri the Great.

Amlaíb and Ímar
Cerball next appears to have allied himself with two Norse or Norse-Gael "kings", Amlaíb Conung, "son of the king of Lochlann", and Ímar, called "king of the Norsemen of all Ireland and Britain" at his death in 873. Ímar is sometimes assumed to be the same person as Ivar the Boneless and Amlaíb to be Olaf the White, respectively son of the legendary Danish viking Ragnar Lodbrok and Olaf Geirstad-Alf of Vestfold descendant of the Yngling dynasty of Norway.  These allies were not sufficiently strong to prevent Máel Sechnaill from taking hostages and tribute from Cerball in 858, but Cerball and Ímar campaigned in Leinster that year, and also against the Norse-Gaels in Munster. The following year, together with Amlaíb Conung, they raided Máel Sechnaill's lands in Mide, but soon afterwards Cerball was compelled to submit again to Máel Sechnaill.

In 860 Cerball defeated a force of Norse who were raiding in Osraige, and later in the year he joined Máel Sechnaill on campaign against Áed Finnliath in the north of Ireland.

Áed and Flann
Máel Sechnaill died in 862 to be succeeded by Áed Finnliath, who married his widow, Cerball's sister Land. Also in 862, Cerball is reported to have defeated a Norwegian fleet under one Rodolb, although it is not clear that this is the same Rodolb who was defeated in 855. In 864 the Fragmentary Annals of Ireland report that the men of Leinster and their Norse allies raided Osraige in revenge for Cerball's raid, and that Eóganachta of Munster took advantage of this to attack him, so that Cerball raided both his neighbours and caused much destruction. The same year he is said to have attacked the neighbouring Déisi.

In 870 Áed Finnliath brought a large army to Leinster and Cerball accompanied him. The army of the y was camped apart from Áed's main force, and was attacked by the Leinstermen. Although Cerball drove them off with heavy loss, Cennétig son of Gáethíne, a kinsman of Cerball, was killed in the battle. With a final notice of an expedition to Connacht and Munster in 871, the Fragmentary Annals are interrupted. In the Annals of Ulster, nothing more is said of Cerball until his death in 888. The next king of Osraige was his brother Riacán.

Legacy
Cerball is remembered in historical sources as a great and heroic king, possessed of victorious and daring exploits with many colourful anecdotes written about him. He is mentioned in all the major Irish annals, bringing the Osraige into military prominence during his reign, securing a very strong marriage alliance with the high king and gaining political independence away from Munster. Irish, Scandinavian and Welsh sources record his existence; several annals in particular contain unique information about him.

The Fragmentary Annals
Of all the Irish annals, the Fragmentary Annals of Ireland contain the most information about him, being composed in Osraige likely at the commission of his descendant Donnchad mac Gilla Pátraic, and therefore caution must be exercised over it as a source. Cerball is portrayed as an archetype of a Christian king who consistently vanquishes his enemies, especially pagan Vikings; yet is recorded allying with rival bands of Vikings to defeat them during his early career. Those Vikings allied with Cerball are portrayed in a more favorable light than those he defeats, thus mitigating the stigma of a Christian king allying with pagan marauders.

Landnámabók
The Icelandic Landnámabók describes Cerball (Kjarvalur) as ruler of Dublin and Earl of Orkney and opens with a list of the most prominent rulers in Viking-age Europe, listing this Ossorian king alongside Popes Adrian II and John VIII; Byzantine Emperors Leo VI the Wise and his brother Alexander; Harald Fairhair, king of Norway; Eric Anundsson and his son Björn Eriksson rulers of Sweden; Gorm the Old king of Denmark; and Alfred the Great, king of England.

While it is unsurprising that Cerball's great-great-grandson should have commissioned a work in which his most illustrious ancestor was portrayed in a heroic light, it is less obvious why Cerball in particular should have such a prominent place in the Icelandic sagas and in the genealogies of the founding families of Iceland as recorded by the Landnámabók. The Landnámabók mentions "Kormlöð", "Rafarta, the daughter of Kjarval", "Dufnial, who was the son of Kjarval" and "Friðgerðr, the daughter of Kjarval". Rafarta or Raforta is also mentioned in Njál's saga, Gretti's saga and the Laxdæla saga, and Friðgerðr in the Vinland sagas. The marriage of "Eithne, daughter of King Kjarval of Ireland" and Hlodvir Thorfinnsson, Earl of Orkney is reported in the Orkneyinga saga and Earl Sigurd the Stout, who was killed at the battle of Clontarf is called their son.

Some of these names are Irish: Kormlöð is the common name Gormflaith, Eithne too is clearly Irish as is Dufnial. It is doubtful whether Rafarta or Fridgerd are Irish, and there are clearly difficulties with the supposed number of generations. Insofar as any conclusions have been reached by historians of Ireland, it appears that the supposed descendants of Cerball left for Iceland in the generation before Donnchad mac Gilla Patraic, towards the end of the tenth century. Given the likely date at which the Landnámabók was compiled, this is rather too far in the past for the genealogies to be considered very reliable. Adding to the uncertainty, the genealogies of the Osraige themselves were subject to comprehensive rewriting in Cerball's time and immediately afterwards, attaching them to the Laigin of Leinster.

It has been suggested that the importance of Cerball in Icelandic writings stems from the popularity of the Fragmentary Annals of Ireland among the Norse-Gaels of eleventh century Ireland, who passed these accounts on to the Icelanders, who then attached this famous and warlike king to their ancestry. Whether Cerball was in fact an ancestor of many prominent settler families is, however, of rather less importance than the fact that the Icelanders considered it worth reporting their descent from Cerball mac Dúnlainge, whether real or contrived. As with the adoption of Norse names, sagas and other features, and the creation of the Norse-Gael culture, Cerball's adoption in Iceland is an example of the contacts between Norse and Gaelic society in the Viking Age.

Annales Cambriae
Cerball's repose is noted in the Annales Cambriae for the year 887, which is noteworthy as he is the only Irish king mentioned therein who wasn't an Uí Néill high king. This indicates his contemporary importance.

Other textual sources
Cerball appears to be referenced in The Prophecy of Berchán, although not by name.

Modern day
Cerball is noted by historians to have been a patron of noteworthy building projects in his kingdom, and his reign likely birthed a flourishing of artistically fine stone carving in Osraige.Dr. Eamon Kelly: http://www.kilkennyarts.ie/programmedetails/a-story-in-stone-irish-medieval-stonecarvers-their-patrons/  In late February 2017, Kilkenny's new Medieval Mile Museum opened to the public, featuring an exhibit which highlights king Cerball's role as a powerful patron of Osraige's early high cross carving tradition.

Family tree
Cerball is hailed as an illustrious ancestor of several prominent lineages in both Ireland, Scotland and Iceland. He is the direct male ancestor of the kings of Osraige after him, and as such is the direct male-line progenitor of the Mac Giolla Phádraig clan who maintained kingship over Osraige and succeeded in the Barony of Upper Ossory in addition to the Earldom of the same and the Castletown Barons. He is also direct-male ancestor of the prominent clan Ua Braonáin (O'Brennan) of Uí Duach (Idough) in Osraige who were a junior sept stemming from a younger son of Cerball.  Icelandic literature also names him as the maternal grandfather of Helgi the Lean, a prominent settler of Iceland from whom many Icelandic families claim descent, including the saga-hero Gunnar of Hlíðarendi.

   Dungal, d. 842.
   |
   |_
   |                  |                 |
   |                  |                 |
   Cerball, d. 888. Riacan, d. 894. Land, d. 890. = Mael Sechnaill  = Aed Finlaith   = Gaethine
   |
   |__
   |                   |        |                  |         |         |          |            |
   |                   |        |                  |         |         |          |            |
   Diarmait, d. 928. Cuilde Ceallach, d.908.      Rafarta   Dunghal   Kormled    Frithgertr   Ethna
   |                            |                 =Eyvindr   |        =Grimolfr  =Iorirhima   =Hlotvir, Earl of Orkney
   |                            |__       Bjarnason  |          |                       |
   ?                            |          |                 Dufthakr   |                       |
   |                            |          |                 |         Thorgrimr               Signuth digri, Earl of Orkney, d. 1014.
   |                  Donnchad, d. 976. Cuilen,  |
   Ceallach,          |                 d. 933.  |           |
   d. 1003.           |                          |           |
               Gilla Patraic, d. 996.            Vilbadr Askell hnokhan
                      |                          |
                      |                          |__
           Mac Giolla Phádraig                   |         |
             Kings of Osraige                    |         |
                                                 Bjollok Bjolan

See also
Dál Birn
Fragmentary Annals of Ireland
Kingdom of Ossory
Kings of Osraige
Fitzpatrick
Mac Giolla Phádraig

Notes

References

 
 
 
 
 
 
 
 
 
 
 
 
 
 
 
 
 
 
 
 
 
 
 
 
 
 
 
 
 
 

External links
 CELT: Corpus of Electronic Texts at University College Cork. The Corpus of Electronic Texts includes the Annals of Ulster and the Four Masters, the Chronicon Scotorum and the Book of Leinster'' as well as Genealogies, and various Saints' Lives. Most are translated into English, or translations are in progress
 The Landnámabók (translated at Northvegr)
 New Headstone carved for King Cerball
 "Eru Íslendingar komnir af Kjarval Írakonungi?" (Icelandic article on Cerball's descendants)
Cerball's graveslab at The Fitzpatrick - Mac Giolla Phádraig Clan Society

Kings of Osraige
9th-century births
888 deaths
People from County Kilkenny
Place of birth unknown
9th-century Irish monarchs
FitzPatrick dynasty